David Gatebe of South Africa won the 2016 Comrades Marathon in a course record.

References

South African ultramarathon runners
South African male marathon runners
Living people
Male ultramarathon runners
1981 births